Edward Horace Fiennes-Clinton, 18th Earl of Lincoln (23 February 1913 – 7 July 2001) was an aristocratic Australian engineer, who succeeded to his family's earldom of Lincoln (cr. 1572) by primogeniture upon the death in 1988 of his 10th cousin, the last Duke of Newcastle.

Life
Born at Melbourne, Australia, in 1913, he was the elder son of Edward Henry Fiennes-Clinton, a Mate in the British Merchant Navy who emigrated to Australia in 1912 before serving with the 51st Battalion, Australian Imperial Force and being killed in action on 17 August 1916 during the First World War.

His mother, Edith Annie, daughter of Captain Horace Guest, brought him up before remarrying, in 1923, Robert Johnston Lynn, a cousin of Deputy Speaker of the Northern Ireland House of Commons, Sir Robert Lynn.

Educated at Hale School, an independent Anglican boarding school in Perth, Western Australia, Fiennes-Clinton then worked as a boilermaker, a welder's and machine-minder's assistant as well as a butcher at the Kalgoorlie Gold Mine.

Story
Fiennes-Clinton learned of his succession to the earldom of Lincoln during a telephone call from a journalist with The Daily Telegraph newspaper in London, who began "Lord Lincoln, if I may be the first to address you so..." He said he had known he might one day inherit the title, but had forgotten about it. Upon the journalist commenting that he seemed unexcited, Lincoln replied: "young man, I have lived for seventy-five years and I have learned to take things as they come". He did however seem disappointed to hear there was little else to inherit apart from the peerage itself.

The Australian press was much more excited by the news, and three camera crews appeared outside the new peer's flat at Elanora Villas, Bunbury, Western Australia, before more reporters arrived by helicopter. Soon after inheriting the Earldom, the new Lord Lincoln travelled to England, where he was warmly received by (among others) leading citizens of the City of Lincoln. The story was soon fictionalized as a storyline in the Australian soap opera Neighbours.

He later wrote an autobiography called Memoirs of an Embryo Earl, published in 1992, and set about putting on record his formal right to the peerage with a view to taking his seat in the House of Lords. After being briefed on the workings of the Upper House by Lord Deedes, and having been received at the College of Arms, Lincoln stated his intention of joining the Conservative benches in the House of Lords. However, there were delays in the process of claiming his seat, which was defeated by the reforms of the upper house in the House of Lords Act 1999. Lincoln thereafter had no automatic right to sit in the Lords, as all but 92 hereditary peers had been removed. His grandson, the 19th Earl, was later courted by New Labour.

Lord Lincoln died in Western Australia on 7 July 2001.

Family
In 1940, Fiennes-Clinton married Leila Ruth Fitzpatrick, née Millen, and they had two children, Patricia Ruth Fiennes-Clinton (born 1 February 1941, now Lady Patricia Elrick), and Edward Gordon Fiennes-Clinton (1943–99; styled Lord Fynes, by courtesy).

After his first wife died on 19 July 1947, Fiennes-Clinton on 3 December 1953 married Linda Alice, daughter of Rev Charles Creed and widow of James Anthony O'Brien; they had no children.

When his 10th cousin, the 10th and last Duke of Newcastle, died on Christmas Day 1988, Fiennes-Clinton succeeded to His Grace's subsidiary title of Earl of Lincoln. His ancestor, Sir Henry Clinton, of Kirkstead, Lincolnshire, was the 2nd Earl of Lincoln's elder son by his second marriage; the 2nd Earl's eldest son's descendants went on to become Dukes of Newcastle.

The family has served in public life since the 1st Baron Clinton was summoned to Parliament in 1299, and in the 18th century Thomas Pelham-Holles, 1st Duke of Newcastle twice-served as Prime Minister. The peerage of Baron Clinton, created by writ of summons, to which all descendants are in remainder, is now held by another distant branch of the Clinton family.

Lord Lincoln's grandson Robert Edward Fiennes-Clinton (born 19 June 1972) is the 19th and present earl, a fellow of the Zoological Society of London, who lives in Perth.

References

External links

1913 births
2001 deaths
20th-century English nobility
21st-century English nobility
Australian peers
People from Bunbury, Western Australia
People from Perth, Western Australia
Engineers from Melbourne
Edward
Edward
Lincoln